is a Japanese web manga series written and illustrated by Sakaomi Yuzaki. It has been serialized on Kadokawa Shoten's digital manga manga magazine Comic It since January 2021. A 10-episode television drama adaptation was broadcast on NHK General TV from November to December 2022.

Media

Manga
Written and illustrated by Sakaomi Yuzaki, She Loves to Cook, and She Loves to Eat originated on Yuzaki's Twitter and Pixiv accounts in March 2020. It then started on Kadokawa Shoten's digital manga manga magazine Comic It on January 8, 2021. Kadokawa Shoten has collected its chapters into individual tankōbon volumes. The first volume was released on June 15, 2021. As of November 15, 2022, three volumes have been released.

In March 2022, Yen Press announced that they licensed the series for English release in North America.

Volume list

Drama
A television drama adaptation was announced in October 2022; it was written by Yuri Yamada, with Gorō Itō composing the music and Manami Higa and Emi Nishino performing the leads. It was broadcast for ten episodes on NHK General TV's Yorudora programming block from November 29 to December 14, 2022.

Other
In November 2022, a store selling merchandise from the series was opened. All the proceeds from the store will be donated to Marriage For All Japan, an organization advocating for same-sex marriage in Japan.

Reception
On Takarajimasha's Kono Manga ga Sugoi! list of best manga of 2022 for women readers, the series ranked second. The series ranked 12th and 13th in the web category of the Next Manga Awards in the 2021 and 2022 editions respectively.

References

External links
  
  
 

2020s LGBT literature
2020s LGBT-related television series
Cooking in anime and manga
Japanese LGBT-related television shows
Japanese webcomics
Josei manga
Kadokawa Shoten manga
NHK television dramas
Romance anime and manga
Webcomics in print
Yen Press titles
Yuri (genre) anime and manga